Charleroi (also known as the Cherubs) was an American basketball team based in Charleroi, Pennsylvania that was a member of the Central Basketball League.

Year-by-year

References 

Basketball teams in Pennsylvania